Nintendo Fusion Tour was a touring rock music and video game festival sponsored by Nintendo, which began in 2003.

Nintendo's Fusion Tour provided early exposure for then-developing bands such as Evanescence, Story of the Year, My Chemical Romance, Fall Out Boy, Anberlin and Panic! at the Disco. The outing expanded from 25 dates in 2003 with 90,000 in attendance to 45 in 2006 with more than 160,000, according to Nintendo.

The event has not been held since 2006, and Nintendo has not explained its plans for the tour.

2003 tour
A + denotes an unofficial tour title.

2003 bands
Evanescence
Cold
Revis
Finger Eleven
Cauterize

2003 games 
GameCube games
 1080° Avalanche
 Billy Hatcher and the Giant Egg (Demo)
 F-Zero GX (Demo)
 Madden NFL 2004
 Soulcalibur II (Demo)
 Star Wars Rogue Squadron III: Rebel Strike
 Viewtiful Joe
 P.N.03
 Wallace & Gromit: Project Zoo

Game Boy Advance games
 Advance Wars 2: Black Hole Rising
 007: Nightfire
 Donkey Kong Country
 Mario Kart: Super Circuit
 Sonic Advance 2
 Street Fighter Alpha 3
 Tony Hawk's Pro Skater 4
 WarioWare, Inc.: Mega Microgame$!
 A Link To The Past / Four Swords

2004 tour

2004 bands
Story of The Year
My Chemical Romance
Lostprophets
Letter Kills

Select shows
Anberlin
Autopilot Off

2004 games
GameCube games
F-Zero GX
Mario Kart: Double Dash
Metroid Prime 2: Echoes (Demo)
Spider-Man 2
Super Smash Bros. Melee
Terminator 3: Redemption
WWE Day of Reckoning

(This list is incomplete)

2005 tour

2005 bands
Fall Out Boy
The Starting Line
Motion City Soundtrack
Boys Night Out
Panic! at the Disco

2005 games
GameCube games
Battalion Wars
Geist
The Legend of Zelda: Twilight Princess (Demo)
Madden: 2006
Mario Baseball
Metroid Prime 2: Echoes
NHL 2006
Resident Evil 4
Super Mario Strikers (Demo)
Super Smash Bros. Melee+
Tiger Woods PGA Tour 2006
Tony Hawk's American Wasteland
Ultimate Spider-Man
WWE Day of Reckoning 2

Nintendo DS games
Lost in Blue
Mario Kart DS
Meteos
Metroid Prime Hunters
Metroid Prime Pinball
Nintendogs
Tom Clancy's Splinter Cell: Chaos Theory
A + denotes an unofficial tour title.

2006 tour
A ** denotes the game was removed or added during the course of the tour.

2006 bands
Hawthorne Heights
Relient K
Emery
Plain White T's
The Sleeping

2006 games
Wii games
Wii Sports: Baseball
Wii Sports: Bowling
Wii Sports: Boxing
Wii Sports: Tennis
Wii Play: Shooting
Excite Truck (Demo)
Metroid Prime 3: Corruption (Demo)**
The Legend of Zelda: Twilight Princess (Demo)**
Tony Hawk's Downhill Jam (Demo)**
WarioWare: Smooth Moves (Demo)

Nintendo DS games
Mario vs. Donkey Kong 2: March of the Minis
Star Fox Command
Elite Beat Agents
New Super Mario Bros.
Final Fantasy III DS
Clubhouse Games**
Mega Man ZX**
Lego Star Wars II: The Original Trilogy**
A ** denotes the game was removed or added during the course of the tour.

See also
Warped Tour
Ozzfest

References

Concert tours
Music festivals staged internationally
Music festivals established in 2003
Nintendo events
Pop music festivals
Rock festivals in England
Video game festivals